Bear Ridge is a ridge in Pulaski County in the U.S. state of Missouri. The Geographic Names Information System marks its location as unknown.

Bear Ridge was so named on account of bears in the area.

References

Landforms of Pulaski County, Missouri
Ridges of Missouri